Calliophis gracilis, is a species of coral snake in the family Elapidae.

References 

gracilis
Reptiles of Thailand
Reptiles of Indonesia
Reptiles of the Malay Peninsula
Reptiles described in 1835
Taxa named by John Edward Gray
Fauna of Sumatra